Biru, Tibet may refer to:

Biru County, county in Tibet
Biru Town, township in Biru County